Bilaluşağı is a village in the Baskil District of Elazığ Province in Turkey. The village is populated by Kurds of the Herdî tribe and had a population of 224 in 2021. The hamlet of Yukarımahalle is attached to the village.

Bilaluşağı gets its name from a former head of the village called Bilal. Ancient graves, which are in poor condition and dating back to the times of the Seljuk Empire, can be found near the village.

References

Villages in Baskil District
Kurdish settlements in Elazığ Province